The Heart Is a Monster is the fourth studio album by the alternative rock band, Failure. It is the follow up to 1996's Fantastic Planet. The album was released on June 30, 2015, via INgrooves Music Group's artist services division, INresidence.

Production
A PledgeMusic campaign was created on January 17, 2015 to fund production of the album.  Part of the promotion included the offering of the album Fantastic Planet recorded on vinyl for the second time.

Reception
According to Metacritic, the album holds a score of 78 indicating "generally favorable" reviews. Alternative Nation states that "The Heart is a Monster is a reckoning force that achieves success as a comeback and a glorious landmark in the evolution in alternative and space rock."  Pitchfork noted that the album had "that charge of intellectual stimulation—spiked with an ever-so-subtle creep factor—that makes The Heart Is a Monster such a thrilling ride." They also commented on the segue (instrumental) tracks, stating that "a whole separate album in that style would've been nice, but even in truncated form the interludes cast Philip Glass-ian shades onto the other songs and suggest that Failure's creativity is far from exhausted."

Consequence of Sound offered praise for the remade "Petting The Carpet" and the lead single "Hot Traveler", but stated that "...for an album that’s over an hour long, it’s easy to point out what could be trimmed," citing "Mulholland Dr." and "Fair Light Era" as missteps. Rolling Stone gave 3.5 stars in their review, stating that Failure deserves their following, but "what might've been a Nineties nostalgia trip feels more like history made new". Exclaim.ca stated that the album "doesn't quite leave the impression mid-'90s Failure did, but despite less experimental approach and cleaner digital production, it's still a compelling listen."

Charts
The Heart Is a Monster debuted July 18, 2015 on the Billboard 200 album chart at #83 and at #43 on the Top Album Sales chart, which excludes on-demand streaming or individually sold tracks. The album debuted at #11 in Alternative Albums, making it the highest debut of Failure's history. The album reportedly sold 7,250 copies in the U.S. in its first week.

Other
 Two music videos were officially produced:
 "Hot Traveler", which shows Failure performing in a warehouse inside a camera dolly track.\
 "Counterfeit Sky", which is a video of the song over a cut of the short film "Grounded" by Kevin Margo (Thor: The Dark World).
 "Petting The Carpet" originally appeared on the compilation album "Golden" as an out-take for Comfort. (original length 3:39)
 "Come Crashing" was part of the Tree of Stars EP – the first song written for the album, and the first new Failure track recorded since the Fantastic Planet album sessions.
 "I Can See Houses" was played live in 1991 but was never recorded in the studio; the live version can be seen on the DVD side of Golden.
 An alternate recording of "The Focus" was released as a single during the PledgeMusic campaign (original length 3:18) and later reworked for the album.

Track listing

Credits

Personnel
 Ken Andrews – lead vocals, guitar, bass, programming
 Greg Edwards – guitar, bass, keyboards, backing vocals
 Kellii Scott – drums, percussion

Additional personnel
 Troy Van Leeuwen – additional guitar (tracks 4, 9, 12, 14)

production
 All songs written by K. Andrews and G. Edwards
 Mixing by Ken Andrews
 Mastering by Gene Grimaldi
 Published by Quinine Music (BMI) and Vicus Music (BMI)
 Recorded, mixed, and mastered at Red Swan Studios, Los Angeles, CA, and Oasis Management Studio One, Burbank, CA.

References

External links
Official Website

2015 albums
Failure (band) albums